Colin Blackman (born 9 March 1942) is an Australian former cricketer. He played eleven first-class matches for New South Wales between 1966/67 and 1968/69.

See also
 List of New South Wales representative cricketers

References

External links
 

1942 births
Living people
Australian cricketers
New South Wales cricketers
People from Griffith, New South Wales
Cricketers from New South Wales